Bourton-on-Dunsmore is a small village in Warwickshire, England. It is within the civil parish of Bourton and Draycote, along with the nearby hamlet of Draycote.

Bourton is located upon a ridge of high ground overlooking the Draycote Water reservoir. A short distance to the east, downhill of Bourton is the hamlet of Draycote, and a short distance west is the village of Frankton.

Bourton-on-Dunsmore was mentioned in the Domesday Book. The village church of St Peter dates to the 13th century, but was mostly rebuilt in the 19th century, it is now grade II listed.

In the village is the grade II listed Bourton Hall; a large stone mansion house which dates from 1791, with later additions. It once had gardens designed by Harold Peto, but had fallen into dereliction by the early-1980s. It was restored, and for many years was the headquarters of the development charity Practical Action (formerly known as Intermediate Technology).  In 2019 the hall was bought by a company who sought to convert it into a luxury wedding venue. In 2021 the company was fined for carrying out renovation work to the hall without planning permission.

References
 Allen, Geoff, (2000) Warwickshire Towns & Villages,

External links

 Bourton-on-Dunsmore pages from Our Warwickshire

Villages in Warwickshire